Eutaw Street is a major street in Baltimore, Maryland, mostly within the downtown area. Outside of downtown, it is mostly known as Eutaw Place.

The south end of Eutaw Street is at Oriole Park at Camden Yards. After this point, the street continues as a pedestrian walkway inside the stadium. A sign above this entrance is marked "Eutaw Street."

Eutaw Street is famously known as the location of Lexington Market.

The north end of Eutaw Street is at Dolphin Street. The street continues past this point under the name Eutaw Place through the communities of Bolton Hill and Reservoir Hill, and ends at Druid Park Lake Drive. Eutaw Street is prefixed with North or South depending on whether it is north or south of Baltimore Street. Eutaw Place does not have such a directional designation.

Eutaw Place was called Gibson Street until 1853. This area was known as a home to the wealthy, particularly the affluent German-Jewish community of Baltimore.

The Baltimore Metro Subway runs below a large part of Eutaw Street. Two of its stations, State Center and Lexington Market, are located along Eutaw Street.

Landmarks
Some major city landmarks are located on or near Eutaw Street. These include:
 Emerson Bromo-Seltzer Tower
 Eutaw Place Temple
 Francis Scott Key Monument
 Hippodrome Theater
 Lexington Market
 Lillie Mae Carroll Jackson Museum
 Maryland General Hospital
 Oriole Park at Camden Yards
 University of Maryland at Baltimore

Gallery

References

Downtown Baltimore
German-Jewish culture in Baltimore
Historic Jewish communities in the United States
Streets in Baltimore
Upper class culture in Maryland